Comic Arts Brooklyn (CAB) is a comic book festival and art book fair organized by the comic book store Desert Island, held annually in Brooklyn, New York. Founded in 2013 as a successor to the Brooklyn Comics and Graphics Festival (BCGF), CAB focuses on self-published, independent, and alternative comics.

Programming
CAB is founded and organized by Gabriel Fowler, the owner of the comic book store Desert Island in Williamsburg, Brooklyn. The festival is centered around a single-day, artist alley-style exhibition space that features roughly 200 artists and comics publishers. The days leading up to and following CAB often include affiliated events, such as gallery exhibitions, art installations, and screenings.

Exhibition space at CAB is invitation-only; artists and vendors must either apply and be accepted, or be invited to attend by the festival's organizers. Admission to the festival is free for members of the public.

History
The Brooklyn Comics and Graphics Festival (BCGF), the predecessor to CAB, was inaugurated in 2009 by Fowler, comics critic and scholar Bill Kartalopoulos, and Dan Nadel, founder of the now-defunct publishing company PictureBox. The festival ran for four years, until Kartalopoulos and Nadel announced in May 2013 that they would no longer organize BCGF. In July 2013, Fowler announced the founding of Comic Arts Brooklyn, to be held in November of that year. CAB was inaugurated on November 9, 2013 at the Our Lady of Mt. Carmel Church in Brooklyn, New York – the same venue where BCGF was formerly held, and with many of the same exhibitors – with programming directed by Paul Karasik. CAB does not officially record attendance for the festival, though organizers have estimated the number of attendees per year as being "in the thousands."

In 2014, CAB expanded from one to two days of programming, with the additional day designated for panel discussions. Organizers considered placing CAB on hiatus in 2016, but instead opted to include fewer exhibitors and reduce the length of the festival to its original single day of programming. In 2017, CAB relocated from Our Lady of Mt. Carmel Church to the Pratt Institute, nearly doubling the size of its exhibition space.

The last CAB was held in 2019, after the planned 2020 show was cancelled due to the COVID-19 pandemic. The event has since been on "indefinite hiatus" due to multiple organizers having relocated from Brooklyn, and the Pratt Institute no longer permitting events held by outside organizations.

Event history

References

External links
 Comic Arts Brooklyn official website (defunct, link via Internet Archive)

Book fairs in the United States
Comics conventions in the United States
November events
Annual events in New York City
Recurring events established in 2013
2013 establishments in New York City
Conventions in New York City
Festivals established in 2013
Comics conventions